Cynthia is a hamlet in central Alberta, Canada within Brazeau County.

Cynthia previously held new town status for almost three years, having incorporated as a new town on June 1, 1956, but dissolving on May 1, 1959.

Demographics 
The population of Cynthia according to the 2005 municipal census conducted by Brazeau County is 50.

See also 
List of communities in Alberta
List of former urban municipalities in Alberta
List of hamlets in Alberta

References 

Brazeau County
Hamlets in Alberta
Former new towns in Alberta